This is a select discography for Brian Tarquin, the American guitarist who has recorded and produced numerous albums featuring solo guitar, smooth jazz, as well as charitable compilations in collaboration with various artists.

Albums

References 

Discographies of American artists
Jazz discographies